Scopula orientalis is a moth of the family Geometridae. It was described by Sergei Alphéraky in 1876. It is found in Bulgaria, North Macedonia, Ukraine, Russia, Turkey and Korea.

References

Moths described in 1876
orientalis
Moths of Europe
Moths of Asia